I, Don Giovanni (Italian: Io, Don Giovanni) is a 2009 Spanish-Italian-Austrian drama film directed by Carlos Saura.

The film narrates the life of Lorenzo da Ponte, an Italian Freemason who wouldn't give up his libertinism, despite being ordered to do so as a priest of the Roman Catholic Church. When the Holy Inquisition accused da Ponte of having betrayed the Christian faith through his licentiousness and publication of criticisms against the church (influenced by Casanova), condemning him to the exile, his close friend Giacomo Casanova wrote a presentation letter for Antonio Salieri, before da Ponte had to leave Venice for Vienna. Here, Salieri introduced him to Mozart, and da Ponte wrote le Nozze di Figaro.

At the intervention of Casanova, da Ponte persuaded Mozart to publish a second edition of the Don Giovanni, which was performed in presence of the Emperor Joseph II, to great success.

Cast 
 Lorenzo Balducci as Lorenzo Da Ponte
 Tobias Moretti as Giacomo Casanova
 Lino Guanciale as Wolfgang Amadeus Mozart
 Ennio Fantastichini as Antonio Salieri
 Francesco Barilli as Vescovo

External links 

2009 biographical drama films
2009 films
Spanish biographical drama films
Italian biographical drama films
Austrian biographical drama films
Biographical films about writers
Films about classical music and musicians
Films about opera
Films set in the 1780s
Films set in Venice
Films set in Vienna
Films directed by Carlos Saura
Films based on Don Giovanni
2009 drama films